This is a list of places in Derbyshire, England.

A

B

C

D

E

F

G

H

I

K

L

M

N

O

P

Q

R

S

T

U

V

W

Y

See also 
 List of settlements in Derbyshire by population
 List of places formerly in Derbyshire
 List of places in England

Places
Derbyshire
Derbyshire-related lists